Johannes Lampe is a Canadian politician who is the current President of Nunatsiavut, an autonomous Inuit region of the Canadian province of Newfoundland and Labrador.

Career
Lampe was sworn in as president in May 2016 after being the only candidate for the role. He hopes to preserve the Inuit culture, identity and language. Before becoming president, he served as a member of the Nunatsiavut Assembly for Nain and he served as Minister of Culture, Recreation and Tourism. Lampe also attempted to return the remains of Labrador Inuit to Labrador from European museums including the remains of Abraham Ulrikab.

Lampe was re-elected in 2020.

Lower Churchill Project
In June 2016, he led a protest at the office of MHA Perry Trimper.

Electoral record

2020 presidential election

2016 presidential election

2014 general election

2012 presidential election

Round 1

Round 2

2008 presidential election

References

Living people
Inuit from Newfoundland and Labrador
Inuit politicians
People from Nain, Newfoundland and Labrador
Year of birth missing (living people)
Indigenous leaders in Atlantic Canada